was a Japanese martial artist who specialized in aikido and judo family of martial arts. He was a pedagogue of martial arts theory (武道論, Budo-ron). He is the founder of Japan Aikido Association and the competitive aikido (aikido kyogi) style. 

Tomiki was a professor at Kenkoku University in Manchuria and later at the Faculty of Education at Waseda University.
Tomiki is credited in devising and introducing new forms of Randori practice in Aikido. He founded his own Aikido system, which has many differences from other Aikido styles, mainly in randori training, and is referred by several names including Tomiki Aikido, Shodokan Aikido and Sport Aikido.

History

Early life and World War II
Kenji Tomiki was born on March 15, 1900 (Meiji 33) in Yokomachi, Semboku, Akita.He was the as the eldest son of the Shosuke Tomiki - a landholder. Japanese-style painter Hoan Hirafuku was his maternal grandfather.

Circa 1909, Tomiki began practising Judo. In 1914, he entered Akita Prefectural Yokote Junior High School (predecessor of the current Akita Prefectural Yokote High School). He was active in the judo club while he was in school. In 1919, he obtained the first dan level of judo. 

In 1924, after enrolling in the Faculty of Political Science and Economics at Waseda University, he began a practising at the Kodokan, under Judo founder Jigoro Kano. He actively practised Judo, despite Jigoro Kano's advanced age and declining health.

In early 1926, he encountered the founder of aikido Morihei Ueshiba. Fascinated by Ueshiba's technique, Tomiki introduced himself and became one Ueshiba's early students. 

In 1927, he went on to graduate school and was promoted to Judo 5th Dan. In 1929, got a job at Miyagi Prefecture Electricity Bureau. In same year, he represented Miyagi Prefecture in the first judo tournament held in front of the Emperor—this tournament became the All Japan Tournament the following year. In 1931, he was assigned to Akita Prefectural Kakunodate Junior High School (predecessor of the current Akita Prefectural Kakunodate High School), in his birth town.

From 1936 till the end of the second world war he lived in Manchukuo (Manchuria) where he taught aikibudo (an early name for aikido) to the Kwantung Army and the Imperial Household Agency.  In 1938 he became an assistant professor at Kenkoku University in Manchukuo. In 1940, he was the first 8th dan black belt to be awarded by Morihei Ueshiba in Aikido history. In 1941, became a professor at Kenkoku University. Following the surrender of Imperial Japan in 1945, Tomiki was detained by Soviet Red Army troops and was held in a three-year internment by the Soviet Union.

Post-war
Tomiki was released from internment in 1948 and subsequently returned to Japan. In 1949, he became a part-time lecturer at Waseda University's Physical Education Department. He would teach Judo and Aikido for many years at Waseda University. It was there that he formulated and expanded his theories concerning both kata based training methods and a particular form of free-style fighting which would put him at odds with much, but not all, of the aikido world.

It was this action on the part of Tomiki of attempting to convert aikido into a sport that led to a schism with the founder Morihei Ueshiba and the Aikikai. Tomiki was urged by the Aikikai to adopt a different name for his art other than “aikido” if he intended to introduce such a system of competition. Convinced of the need to modernize aikido, he stood his ground and persisted in his efforts to evolve a viable form of competition.

In 1952, he was selected as one of the members of the Kodokan Goshinjutsu Enactment Committee. Tomiki is perhaps best known in the judo world for his influence in the developing of Kodokan Goshin Jutsu kata. His work Judo is considered a classic.  The aikido appendix to the book is thought to be the earliest English language text on aikido.

In 1953, Tomiki along with 9 other martial art instructors were selected to tour US Air Force bases in the United States and was thus the first aikido instructor to visit the US. In 1954, he became a professor at Waseda University. 

Between 1955 and 1959, he helped formalize the Self-Defense Forces unarmed fighting system (Jieitaikakutojutsu).

In 1958, Waseda University Aikido Club was established and became the first director. On same year, he published the book “Aikidō nyūmon” 
(『合気道入門』 - Eng. "Introduction to Aikido"). In 1961, Tomiki almost formalized aikidō kyōgi/competitive Aikido. In 1964, he established "Physical Education Specialization" in the Department of Education, Faculty of Education, Waseda University, and became the chief professor.

In 1967, Tomiki opened his Shodokan honbu Dojo which he used as a testing ground for his theories on aikido and competition. Tomiki followed Ueshiba as the Aikido division head of the Kokusai Budoin-International Martial Arts Federation (IMAF Japan). In 1970, Tomiki retired from Waseda University and, in the same year, presided over the first All-Japan Student Aikido Tournament. The basic rules for the holding of aikido tournaments had been worked out by this time in what would become an ongoing experiment to develop a viable form of competitive aikido.

In 1971, Kodokan awarded Tomiki with the 8th Dan blackbelt. Then, in 1974, he founded the Japan Aikido Association (JAA) from an earlier organization of the same name to promote his theories. In 1975, he became Vice Chairman of the Japanese Academy of Budo.

Tomiki set up a new dojo for the Shodokan in Osaka on March 28, 1976, with the support of Masaharu Uchiyama, Vice-Chairman of the J.A.A. This dojo was intended to function as the headquarters of the Japan Aikido Association and Tomiki served as its first director. The current head of the dojo and chief instructor of the Shodokan Aikido Federation is Tetsuro Nariyama.

Professor Tomiki died from complications of colorectal cancer on December 24, 1979.

Known martial arts disciples
 Ōba Hideo
 Teramoto Shōichi
 Uchiyama (Miyake) Junkichi
 Nariyama Tetsurō
 Morikawa Sumiharu
 Shishida Fumiaki
 Miyake Tsunako
 Inoue Takeshi
 Kogure Hiroaki 
 Takemoto Yoshio
 Satō Tadayuki
 Obuchi Keizo
 Suzuki Kunio
 Robert Dziubla

Writing
 Chosaku jūdō taisō (1954 - 柔道体操 - Judo gymnastics) 
 Aikidō nyūmon (1958 - 合気道入門 - Introduction to Aikido ) 
 Shin aikidō tekisuto (1964 -  新合気道テキスト - New Aikido Textbook)

See also
 Kodokan Goshin Jutsu
 Jieitaikakutojutsu

References

Further reading
Aikido Journal Encyclopedia Interview with Kenji Tomiki (Part 2)

External links
Early Movie on Kenji Tomiki's method
Kenji Tomiki's method Part 1
Kenji Tomiki's method Part 2
Kenji Tomiki: Judo Taiso – a method of training Aiki no Jutsu through Judo principles
Kenji Tomiki – Introduction to Goshinjutsu
A Letter from Kenji Tomiki to Isamu Takeshita

Tomiki Kenji
Japanese male judoka
1900 births
1979 deaths
Martial arts school founders
Waseda University alumni
20th-century philanthropists
20th-century Japanese people

fr:Kenji Tomiki